Yang Jun is a Wushu master who was born in Taiyuan, Shanxi, China in 1968 into the famous Yang family of martial artists. A son of Yang Dao Fang and a grandson of Yang Zhenduo, he is a direct descendant of Yang Cheng Fu and of Yang Lu Chan, the creator of Yang-style t'ai chi ch'uan. Yang Jun is a sixth-generation descendant of the Yang Family of t'ai chi ch'uan, and is the fifth lineage-holder of the style.

Biography
Master Yang Jun spent his childhood and formative years living with his grandparents.  Growing up in a martial arts family, he saw and heard his grandfather training his students.  So, it is in this nurturing environment that he became deeply immersed in his family’s taijiquan heritage.  Yang Jun began studying and training in the soft style martial art of t'ai chi ch'uan at age 5 with his grandfather Yang Zhenduo, who raised him.

Proficient in Hand Form, Sword, Saber, Push Hands, and other forms of the art of the Yang-style of t'ai chi ch'uan, Grandmaster Yang Zhenduo has prepared him to continue and advance the martial arts tradition of the Yang family.

Since 1986 he has travelled to teach with his grandfather, first inside China and then internationally (to the USA) in 1990.  After many years and dozens of seminars around the world, Yang Jun has now become an accomplished martial artist and a teacher in his own right. His forms seamlessly combine softness with hardness, finesse with spirit, and restraint with expression.

In 1989 he graduated with a degree in physical education from Shanxi University, China.

Between 1995 and 1997, Yang Jun served as the Vice President of Operations, Techniques and Training, and since 1997, as First President of the Shanxi Province Yang Style Tai Chi Chuan Association, which now has over 30,000 members in the province of Shanxi alone. In October 1998 Yang Jun and his grandfather Yang Zhenduo founded the International Yang Style Tai Chi Chuan Association in Seattle, Washington, United States, and has served as its President since. In August 1999 he moved to Seattle with his wife Fang Hong to establish the International Association there, and in September 1999, he started the Yang Cheng Fu Tai Chi Chuan Center in Seattle's International District (Chinatown).

In 1995 the Chinese WuShu Academy recognized Yang Jun as a famous Wushu master in Shanxi Province. In 1996 he was certified as the highest level national judge and served as the head judge at the 1998 National Tai Chi Chuan Competition in China.

Master Yang Jun has been interviewed by several martial arts magazines due to his lifetime expertise in Taijiquan.  As the assistant to his grandfather, he has also appeared in several educational videos, such as Yang Style Taijiquan by Yang Zhenduo and Taijiquan, Sword and Saber (1996), produced by China Sports Publishers. Master Yang Jun has published several educational videos of his own, including Yang Style Taijiquan Form 49 (2001) and Yang Family Tai Chi Chuan Traditional Form (2005).

Yang Jun has a daughter, Yang Ya Ning, born in 1992, and a son, Yang (Jason) Yajie, born in 2002.

Lineage holder
In July 2009, at the First International Tai Chi Chuan Symposium, current lineage holder, Grandmaster Yang Zhenduo, announced that Yang Jun is the fifth lineage-holder of the Traditional Yang-style t'ai chi ch'uan.

T'ai chi ch'uan lineage tree with Yang-style focus

See also
 103-form Yang family tai chi chuan (Long Form)
 Two-person Pushing Hands

References

External links
 Master Yang Jun performing the Traditional Yang Style Tai Chi Chuan 49 Demonstration Form (YouTube)

1968 births
Living people
Chinese tai chi practitioners
Sportspeople from Taiyuan